Omer Letorey (4 May 1873 – 21 March 1938) was a French composer.

Born in Chalon-sur-Saône, from 1887 Letorey attended the music school of Louis Niedermeyer. From 1891 he studied at the Conservatoire de Paris with Émile Pessard; at the same time he became organist at the Ste-Elisabeth church. In 1895 he won the first Premier Grand Prix de Rome with the lyrical scene Clarisse Harlowe.

After his studies Letorey was musical director at the Comédie-Française until 1922. Furthermore, he was from 1900 successor of Edmond Missa, organist at the Église Saint-Thomas-d'Aquin, from 1903 cantor and organist at the St-Pierre-de-Chaillot church and from 1923 to 1925 cantor at the St-Honoré-d'Eylau church.

In addition to church music, Letorey composed several drama music and operas. His incidental music for Macbeth, which was premiered in 1914 at the Comédie Française, and the opera Le Sicilien (after Molière), which was premiered in 1930 at the Opéra-Comique with the mezzo-soprano Germaine Cernay, had great success.

Letorey died in Issy-les-Moulineaux in 1938.

Works 
 Stage music for Sophonisbe
 Stage music for Macbeth by Jean Richepin, 1914
 Stage music for Riquet à la Houppe
 Stage music for Mangeront-ils? by Victor Hugo
 Stage music for Juliette et Roméo
 Stage music for Le malade Imaginaire by Molière
 Stage music for Les Fâcheux by Molière
 Le Brand, symphonic poem after Henrik Ibsen
 Cléopâtre, opéra comique
 Le Sicilien ou l’Amour peintre, opéra comique, 1930
 L’Œillet blanc, opéra comique
 Valse arabesque for piano
 Fleurs sans neige for piano
 La Vénitienne for piano

External links 
 Omer Letorey on Musica et memoria

1873 births
1938 deaths
People from Chalon-sur-Saône
Conservatoire de Paris alumni
French Romantic composers
20th-century French composers
French male classical composers
French opera composers
French composers of sacred music
Prix de Rome for composition
20th-century French male musicians
19th-century French male musicians